Two ships of the United States Navy have borne the name USS Jeannette:

 , was formerly a Royal Navy gunboat HMS Pandora, launched in 1861, purchased by the US Navy in 1878 for an expedition to the North Pole, and sunk in 1881 in the Arctic Ocean
 , was launched in 1905, acquired by the US Navy in 1917 for service as a patrol craft during World War I, and sold in 1920

See also
 
 Jeannette (disambiguation)

United States Navy ship names